Kolahun District is the largest administrative district of Lofa County in Liberia. It has an estimated population (July, 2008) of 59,057. Kolahun was the scene of heavy fighting between government troops and rebels during Liberia's second civil war, causing massive shifts in population and destruction of property.

Kolahun District is no more consider as the largest administrative district in Lofa County because of the creations of two additional administrative districts out of Kolahun district.

Lukambeh and Wanhasa administrative districts are the two districts created that were part of Kolahun district.

Lukambeh District comprises two clans, LUCASU and Hembeh. While Wanhasa District  also comprises two clans,  Wanwoma and Hasala clans. Kolahun District now left with two clans too, Tahamba and Vulukohah.

See also
Genga, Liberia

Districts of Liberia
Lofa County